The Asian Women's U20 Volleyball Championship is an international volleyball competition in Asia and Oceania contested by the under 20 women's national teams of the members of Asian Volleyball Confederation (AVC), the sport's continent governing body. Tournaments have been awarded every two years since 1980. The top 2 teams qualified for the FIVB Volleyball Women's U21 World Championship.The current champion is Japan, which won its seventh title at the 2022 tournament.

Formerly, the championship was entitled Asian Women's U19 Volleyball Championship, but in accordance with the FIVB Board of Administration Meeting on 21–22 March 2022, which announced to align the FIVB age group categories per gender to Under-19 and Under-21 for both genders, the adjustment of 2022 Age Group Championships has also been considered important for representative women’s age group teams from Asia to compete in the FIVB Age Group Championships in 2023.

The 20 Asian Championship tournaments have been won by three different national teams. China have won twelve times. The other Asian Championship winners are Japan, with seven titles; and South Korea, with one title.

Results summary

Teams reaching the top four

Champions by region

Hosts

Medal summary

Participating nations

Debut of teams

Awards

Most Valuable Player

Best Opposite Spiker

Best Outside Spikers

Best Middle Blockers

Best Setter

Best Libero

Former awards

Best Scorer

Best Spiker

Best Server

Best Blocker

See also

 Asian Men's U20 Volleyball Championship
 Asian Women's Volleyball Championship
 Volleyball at the Asian Games
 AVC Cup for Women
 Asian Women's U23 Volleyball Championship
 Asian Girls' U18 Volleyball Championship
 List of sporting events in Taiwan

External links
 Official AVC website

 
U20

V
International volleyball competitions
International women's volleyball competitions
Youth volleyball
Volleyball competitions in Asia
Biennial sporting events
Asian Volleyball Confederation competitions
Asian youth sports competitions